Tishanskaya is a rural locality (a stanitsa) and the administrative center of Tishanskoye Rural Settlement, Nekhayevsky District, Volgograd Oblast, Russia. The population was 358 as of 2010. There are 10 streets.

Geography 
Tishanskaya is located 23 km southeast of Nekhayevskaya (the district's administrative centre) by road. Krasnovsky is the nearest rural locality.

References 

Rural localities in Nekhayevsky District